Anja Prislan (born 11 December 1985 in Ljubljana) is a Slovenian former tennis player.

In her career, Prislan won seven doubles titles on the ITF Women's Circuit. On 17 October 2011, she reached her best singles ranking of world No. 460. On 7 October 2013, she peaked at No. 289 in the doubles rankings.

On the WTA Tour, Prislan twice played in the doubles main draw of the Slovenia Open.

ITF finals

Singles (0–1)

Doubles (7–16)

References
 
 

1985 births
Living people
Sportspeople from Ljubljana
Slovenian female tennis players